Allan Davis Winans (born January 12, 1936, in San Francisco, California), known as A. D. Winans, is an American poet, essayist, short story writer and publisher. Born in San Francisco, California, he returned home from Panama in 1958, after serving three years in the military. In 1962, he graduated from San Francisco State College.

He made his home away from home in North Beach where he became friends with Beat poets like Bob Kaufman and Jack Micheline.

Second Coming

He was the founder of Second Coming Press, a small press based in San Francisco that published books, poetry broadsides, a magazine, and anthologies. He edited Second Coming Magazine for seventeen years from 1972 to 1989. Winans became friends with Charles Bukowski, whose work he published. He also published Bukowski's then-girlfriend, Linda King. Other writers he published included Jack Micheline, Bob Kaufman, Lawrence Ferlinghetti, Allen Ginsberg, Philip Levine, Josephine Miles, David Meltzer, Charles Plymell. etc.

In 2002, he published his memoir, Holy Grail: Charles Bukowski & The Second Coming Revolution.

Other work
A.D. Winans has had poetry, book reviews, and short stories published in over 2,000 magazines and anthologies.  He has written 63 books of poetry, and two books of prose.

A song poem of his was performed at Alice Tully Hall, New York City.  In 2006, he was awarded a PEN National Josephine Miles Award for excellence in literature.  In 2009 PEN Oakland presented him with a Lifetime Achievement Award. In 2015 he was a recipient of a Kathy Acker Award in poetry and publishing.

His latest book, "San Francisco Poems" published by Little Red Tree Publishing, CT, includes an extended biography with many photographs, plus 99 poems, old and new.

In 2016 he appeared in a documentary movie on the life of poet Bob Kaufman.  The movie was premiered in April 2016 at the San Francisco International Movie Festival.

References

External links
 A. D. Winans books with erbacce-press
 A. D. Winans web site
 A. D. Winans autobiography
 Short biography of Winans
 Litseen, A.D. Winans: second coming
 Jacket Magazine #26 (October 2004). Review of A.D. Winan's Holy Grail: Charles Bukowski & The Second Coming Revolution by Jim Feast
 "San Francisco Poems" by A. D. Winans.
 http:// www.winansfansite.com

1936 births
Living people
American male poets
Beat Generation writers
Outlaw poets
Writers from San Francisco
PEN Oakland/Josephine Miles Literary Award winners